The Syrian Basketball League is the top-tier professional men's basketball league in Syria. It is organized annually as a national championship with playoffs and a national cup by the Syrian Basketball Federation. Both Aleppo teams, Jalaa SC and Al-Ittihad SC, dominated the league until 1993.

History

Jalaa SC, previously known as Shabibeh, dominated the league from 1956 until 1978. Then another team from Aleppo, Al-Ittihad SC, took all the titles until 1993. Later on, Damascus clubs Al Wahda and Al-Jaish SC won some titles sporadically. In 2021, for the first time in SBL history, the league was won by a club from the city of Homs, Al-Karamah SC.

Sponsorship
As of 2022, the league's main partners are Sinalco, Syriatel, Cham Wings Airlines, Sama TV and Syria TV.

Competition format

The SBL is played by the international FIBA rules. Since 2020–21 the SBL season has a new format. In the regular season, all teams play each other first home and away.

Based on the order in the first round, the top four teams play the playoff system. The semi-final consists of a series played in the twice-to-beat format of the best team with the worst and the second with the third of four. 

The final is played in the format of two advancing semi-finalists in a series of three winning matches in the best of five format.

Promotion and relegation
The two worst teams relegate at the end of the season and the two best teams in Division 2 advance to the league.

Current clubs
2021–22 teams:

Title holders

Performances

Finals

Performance by club

Performance by city

Women's league
2021–22 teams:

References

External links
 Syrian Basketball Federation website

   
Basketball competitions in Syria
Basketball leagues in Asia
Women's basketball leagues in Asia
Sports leagues established in 1956
Basketball